Heroes Of The Night (previously called Eroi della notte) is an Italian rock/blues band formed in 2008 by Daniel Solero and Daniele Rodes.
In 2012 the band gained notoriety after they recorded a cover of the song "We Are Young". The song was selected for the finals of Rock Revolution, music contest organized by the Italian singer Vasco Rossi. The music video of this cover reached 500.000 views on YouTube.
The band released two albums, "Al 100%" and "HOTN", during the period when the band was in California in 2015.

Band members
Daniel Solero - Vocals, Guitar
Daniele Rodes - Guitar
Erich Batagliola - Bass
Fabio Fragnelli - Guitar
Marco Cannelli - Drums

References 

Italian rock music groups